This is a list of the most densely populated city subdivisions with over  in the world with an area of at least 1 km2. Most are districts of large cities and may vary significantly in regional importance. Note this list is not exhaustive as data is hard to come by for many places on earth.

List

See also 
List of cities proper by population density
List of countries and dependencies by population density
Kowloon Walled City

Notes

References

Barangays
At least a dozen barangays have population densities over 200,000 people per square km, which are very small sections or neighborhoods (not city districts) within Manila, with the highest that of Barangay 717 at 277,007.3 people per square km.

References
 PRC data from census in ?2000 (and from census in ?2001) plus December 2004 land survey where footnoted.
 Philippines data from census in 2000.
 Spanish data from census in 2006.
 US data from census in 2000.
 ROC (Taiwan) data from census in 2005.
 French data from census in 1999.

External links 
 Hong Kong population
 Areas by district in Hong Kong

City districts
 City districts by population density
Districts by population density